The Green Park Inn is a historic hotel located on the Eastern Continental Divide in Blowing Rock, North Carolina.  The hotel was built in the 1880s and operated continuously until May 24, 2009, reopening after change of ownership and renovation on October 29, 2010.

The Green Park Inn is a member of Historic Hotels of America, the official program of the National Trust for Historic Preservation for recognizing and celebrating the finest historic hotels across America.

Past guests of the hotel have included John D. Rockefeller, Herbert Hoover, Annie Oakley, Calvin Coolidge, Eleanor Roosevelt and Margaret Mitchell among others.  It was added to the National Register of Historic Places on June 3, 1982. It is located in the Green Park Historic District.

In the latter part of the Civil War a small fortification was built on the site of the Green Park by Federal Troops.

The hotel is purported to be haunted, and has played host over the years to several conventions of ghost hunters.

In the face of a difficult economy, the Green Park Inn was closed seeking a new buyer in 2009, and foreclosed later that year.

On March 31, 2010, The Green Park Inn was purchased by two New York real estate investors who were already the owners of a number of other hotel properties. The new owners worked extensively with the Blowing Rock Historical Society and the State Historic Preservation authority in order to the retain charm, character, and historical integrity of the property.  Just off the Lobby is the History Room which recounts the Hotel's storied past and contains the original Green Park U.S. Post Office.

Following an aggressive renovation of the property, The Green Park Inn reopened to the public on October 29, 2010.  During the refurnishing, the owners purchased only American made products.

On July 1, 2011, the Green Park Inn reopened the Laurel Room Restaurant (now named the Chestnut Grille, to hone the American Chestnut from which the hotel is primarily constructed) and the Divide Tavern (so named as it straddles the Eastern Continental Divide) following a gut renovation of the hotel's kitchen facilities.  The new food and beverage operations was headed by James Beard award-winning Chef James Welch.

On October 29, 2011, the Green Park Inn celebrated its first anniversary of reopening after having a progressively successful year.  In 2016, the hotel celebrated its 125th anniversary at a gala dinner and dance celebrating a milestone for the state's second oldest operating resort hotel and the last of the "Grand Manor" hotels still operating in western North Carolina.  Included among the guests were descendants of two of the three hotels founders, the Bernhardt family and the Harper family.

References

 Winston-Salem Journal (July 31, 2009). Owner of Green Park Inn, high bidder to negotiate deal.
 Watauga Democrat (August 21, 2009). Green Park Inn sold in courthouse sale.
 https://web.archive.org/web/20110714121251/http://www2.mountaintimes.com/watauga_weekly/Green_Park_Inn_sold_id_001107

Hotel buildings on the National Register of Historic Places in North Carolina
Queen Anne architecture in North Carolina
Colonial Revival architecture in North Carolina
Hotel buildings completed in 1882
Buildings and structures in Watauga County, North Carolina
National Register of Historic Places in Watauga County, North Carolina
Historic Hotels of America